Lhotka may refer to:

Places in the Czech Republic
Lhotka (Beroun District)
Lhotka (Frýdek-Místek District)
Lhotka (Jihlava District)
Lhotka (Mělník District)
Lhotka (Přerov District)
Lhotka (Žďár nad Sázavou District)
Komorní Lhotka
Lhotka nad Labem
Lhotka u Litultovic
Lhotka u Radnic
Ostrovec-Lhotka
, a cadastral area in Prague

People 
Bonny Pierce Lhotka (born 1942), American artist
Fran Lhotka (1883–1962), Czech-born Croatian composer
Peter Lhotka, Canadian film producer

See also 
 Lhota